General Norman Johnson (May 23, 1941 – October 13, 2010) was an American R&B singer, frontman of the Chairmen of the Board,  songwriter, and record producer.

Biography
Johnson made an early start in music when he began singing in his church choir at the age of six. His recording debut came six years later on Atlantic Records, which recorded his group the Humdingers, although the tracks remain unreleased. In 1961, and following a change in name to the Showmen, Johnson and the group recorded “It Will Stand”, a single for Minit Records. It was a chart hit in both 1961 and 1964. Although the Showmen recorded other offerings for Minit and Swan, including such hits as "39-21-46", they split up in 1968.

Johnson attempted an abortive solo career before joining the then new Invictus label in Detroit, Michigan. Steered by Holland-Dozier-Holland, Johnson recruited Danny Woods (ex-The Showmen), Harrison Kennedy, and Eddie Curtis and created  Chairmen of the Board. Their debut single "Give Me Just a Little More Time" rose to #3 in the U.S. Billboard R&B chart in 1970. Additional hits included "(You've Got Me) Dangling on a String" and "Everything's Tuesday".

Johnson commenced a career as songwriter with "Pay to the Piper", becoming a modest success for Chairmen of the Board. Other songs he wrote were successful when recorded by other musicians. These included the Grammy Award-winning "Patches" for Clarence Carter (Jerry Reed also recorded a country music version). Invictus Records labelmates Honey Cone recorded the Johnson penned tracks "Want Ads", "Stick Up", and "One Monkey Don't Stop No Show". Johnson also wrote "Bring the Boys Home" for Freda Payne.

Chairmen of the Board's popularity diminished in the middle of the 1970s, although Johnson and Woods remained together re-billed as the Chairmen. Johnson tried a solo career again in 1976, and his debut solo album on Arista Records was a modest success. He teamed again with Woods in the following decade, making a living on the beach music circuit. In 1993, Johnson released the album What Goes Around Comes Around (recorded with Woods).

In recognition of the contribution that Johnson has made to American popular music, the Virginia General Assembly designated June 9, 2001 as General Johnson Day in Virginia.

Johnson died on October 13, 2010 in suburban Atlanta, Georgia. His obituary in The New York Times reported that his family attributed his death to complications of lung cancer. Other obituaries did not mention lung cancer but did note that he was recovering from recent knee surgery.

See also
List of people from Hampton Roads

References

External links
The Showmen singles discography
[ Chairmen of the Board biography] at Allmusic website
[ General Johnson biography] at Allmusic website
 
  as Norman Johnson
  as N. Johnson
General Johnson interview by Pete Lewis, 'Blues & Soul' August 1987 (reprinted December 2010)
An interview with General at Soul Express

1941 births
2010 deaths
American male singer-songwriters
American rhythm and blues musicians
American gospel singers
American rhythm and blues singer-songwriters
Record producers from Virginia
Grammy Award winners
Singer-songwriters from Virginia
Musicians from Norfolk, Virginia
Deaths from lung cancer
Deaths from cancer in Georgia (U.S. state)